Darpan (Hindi: दर्पण, Bengali: দর্পণ, Nepali: दर्पण) means mirror in several Hindic languages and may refer to

People
Darpan Inani (born 1994), Indian chess player
Syed Ishrat Abbas ("Darpan", 1928–1980), Pakistani film actor

Media
Darpan (1970) a Bollywood Hindi Indian Film
Darpan Chhaya, a 2001 Nepalese film
Darpan Chhaya 2, a 2017 Nepalese film
Badmash Darpan, a Bhojpuri book by Teg Ali Teg
Jagat Darpan, a newspaper in Gujarat, India
Maya Darpan, a 1972 Indian Hindi-language film
Nil Darpan, a Bengali play written by Dinabandhu Mitra in 1858–1859
Pratiyogita Darpan, an Indian bilingual magazine
Samachar Darpan, a defunct Bengali weekly newspaper

Other
Shaala Darpan, an ICT programme of Ministry of Human Resource Development, India